Long Live the Rebels is the eleventh studio album of the Christian rock band, Disciple, released on October 14, 2016.

Background 
Following the success of Attack's Kickstarter campaign, the band raised over double their initial fundraising goal in the Kickstarter for this album. The album was released on October 14, 2016. Two songs, "Erase" and "Underdog Fight Song", were released to backers when the campaign ended, and the first single, "God Is With Us" is set to be released to radio on October 24, 2016.

Critical reception 

Matt Conner of CCM Magazine gave the album 3.5 stars out of 5, stating that the "melodic metal set sounds as tight as anything in the band’s catalog."

Christopher Smith of Jesus Freak Hideout wrote "Long Live The Rebels contains traces of Disciple's previous records, but like most other Disciple albums, it does have its own identity as a record."

Track listing

Personnel 
 Kevin Young – lead vocals
 Josiah Prince – rhythm guitar, bass guitar, backing vocals, co-lead vocals
 Andrew Stanton – lead guitar, bass guitar, backing vocals
 Joey West – drums

Charts

References 

2016 albums
Disciple (band) albums
Tooth & Nail Records albums
Albums produced by Aaron Sprinkle